Cymothoe may refer to: 

Cymothoe, one of the Nereids, known for helping Aeneas retrieve his ships, along with Triton, after Aeolus buffeted his fleet on the orders of Juno
Cymothoe (butterfly), a genus of African butterflies